The 2010–11 College of Charleston Cougars men's basketball team represented the College of Charleston in the 2010–11 NCAA Division I men's basketball season. The Cougars, led by head coach Bobby Cremins, played their home games at Carolina First Arena in Charleston, South Carolina, as members of the Southern Conference. The Cougars won a share of the regular-season title in the Southern Conference, and advanced to the championship game of the SoCon tournament, where they were defeated by Wofford.

College of Charleston failed to qualify for the NCAA tournament, but received an automatic bid to the 2011 NIT as the regular-season champions of the Southern Conference. The Cougars advanced to the quarterfinals of the NIT, where they were eliminated by eventual champions Wichita State, 82–75.

Roster 

Source

Schedule and results

|-
!colspan=9 style=|Exhibition

|-
!colspan=9 style=|Regular season

|-
!colspan=9 style=| SoCon tournament

|-
!colspan=9 style=| NIT

Source

References

College of Charleston Cougars men's basketball seasons
College of Charleston
College of Charleston
College of Charleston men's basketball
College of Charleston men's basketball